Miramella irena is a species of insect in family Acrididae. It is found in Hungary and Romania.

References

Sources

Acrididae
Insects described in 1921
Taxonomy articles created by Polbot
Orthoptera of Europe